The rosy-scales fairy-wrasse (Cirrhilabrus rubrisquamis), also known as the red velvet fairy wrasse, is a species of wrasse native to the Chagos Archipelago in the Indian Ocean.

It is considered data deficient by the IUCN, and is generally very poorly know, but it is possible that the similar C. wakanda (described as a new species from coastal East Africa in 2019) is a junior synonym of C. rubrisquamis. Conversely, C. rubrisquamis was formerly considered to occur in the Maldives and Sri Lanka, but in 2022 this population was described as a new species C. finifenmaa.

References

Rosy-scales fairy-wrasse
Taxa named by John Ernest Randall
Fish described in 1983